On Trial may refer to:

On Trial (1917 film), an American silent film directed by James Young
On Trial (1928 film), an American film directed by Archie Mayo
On Trial (1939 film), an American film directed by Terry O. Morse
On Trial (1954 film), a French-Italian film directed by Julien Duvivier
On Trial (play), a 1914 play by Elmer Rice
"On Trial" (Upstairs, Downstairs), the first episode of the British TV series Upstairs, Downstairs, aired 1971
On Trial UK, an English punk rock band